Arttu Kiramo (born April 15, 1990 in Jyväskylä) is a Finnish freestyle skier, specializing in  moguls.

Kiramo competed at the 2010 Winter Olympics for Finland. He qualified for the moguls final, finishing 16th.

As of February 2013, his best showing at the World Championships came in 2011, placing 7th in the dual moguls event.

Kiramo made his World Cup debut in March 2007. As of February 2013, his best performance at a World Cup event is 8th, achieved at two moguls events in 2010/11 and 2011/12. His best World Cup overall finish is 18th, in 2010/11 and 2011/12.

References

1990 births
Living people
Olympic freestyle skiers of Finland
Freestyle skiers at the 2010 Winter Olympics
Freestyle skiers at the 2014 Winter Olympics
Sportspeople from Jyväskylä
Finnish male freestyle skiers
21st-century Finnish people